Hot FM is a privately owned radio station in Accra, Ghana. Hot FM broadcasts both on 93.9 FM and online. The station is owned by Francis Poku.

External links 
 Official website

References 

| website = https://hotfmghana.com

Radio stations in Ghana
Mass media in Accra